St. Francis Xavier's Church is a Roman Catholic parish located at 135, Jalan Gasing, Petaling Jaya, Selangor. The building of the church was officiated in 1957 by the then Catholic Bishop of Kuala Lumpur, Rt Rev. Tan Sri Dominic Aloysius Vendargon DD; it was one of the only three Catholic parishes established in Petaling Jaya (the other two parishes are Church of the Assumption, Petaling Jaya and Church of St. Ignatius, Petaling Jaya). 

St. Francis Xavier is a Jesuit Parish, the only such parish in Malaysia. St Francis Xavier's Church is built on the ground owned by the Jesuit Fathers in Malaysia, and the Jesuit Residence is located next to the church on the same ground. 

A hostel for Catholic students attending the nearby Universiti Malaya was also situated in the same compound.  Adjoined to the church is the Catholic High School, a Chinese-type Mission School started by the Marist Brothers. The Marist Brothers are still the owner of the school. 

Ahead of its Golden Jubilee on 3 December 2011, the church underwent major redecoration works, with the installation of a reredos and several large stained glass panels, depicting the Stations of the Cross, the life of St. Francis Xavier, Christ the Good Shepherd, and Mary, Queen of Heaven, surrounded by a myriad of Jesuit saints and Blesseds.

In 2016, the Church underwent further renovations, which involved air conditioning the premises.

See also
 List of Jesuit sites

References

External links 
 Official site

1961 establishments in Malaya
Churches completed in 1961
Petaling Jaya
Roman Catholic churches in Selangor